The Juno V series of rockets were a design that was proposed in the late 1950s but cancelled. The rockets were multi-stage and, although they failed to reach production, their sections were used in other designs.

Juno V-A 
Juno V-A was studied in 1958, as a new name for the Super-Jupiter rocket. Super-Jupiter planned on using four Rocketdyne E-1 engines in its second stage, but this project was cancelled so V-A would use the first stage of a Saturn I launcher to propel it into space and a whole Titan I ICBM to continue the journey. Juno V-A was never developed, but all its stages were used on different launch vehicles, now retired as of today.

Juno V-B 
Juno V-B, studied in the same year as Juno V-A, was proposed for lunar and interplanetary missions into space. It was just like the Juno V-A, except the third stage, originally the second stage of a Titan I booster, would be replaced with a Centaur C high-energy third stage. A year after Juno V-B's study, the booster received a new name: the Saturn A-1, which, like the Juno series of rockets was never built in its original planned form, but all its stages were used on different launch vehicles.

References 
 Bilstein, Roger E, Stages to Saturn, US Government Printing Office, 1980.
 Lowther, Scott, Saturn: Development, Details, Derivatives and Descendants, Work in progress. Available chapters may be ordered directly from Scott Lowther at web site indicated. Web Address when accessed: https://web.archive.org/web/20070521083808/http://www.webcreations.com/ptm.

Saturn (rocket family)
Cancelled space launch vehicles